Gary Michael Cole (born September 20, 1956) is an American actor. He began his professional acting career on stage at Chicago's Steppenwolf Theatre Company in 1985. His breakout role was as Jack 'Nighthawk' Killian in the NBC series Midnight Caller (1989). 

Further prominent television roles include Sheriff Lucas Buck in American Gothic (1995–1996), Vice President Bob Russell in The West Wing (2003–2006), Kurt McVeigh in both The Good Wife (2010–2016) and The Good Fight (2017–2022), Kent Davison in Veep (2013–2019), and Special Agent Alden Parker in NCIS (2021–present ). A prolific voice actor, Cole's voice roles include Harvey Birdman in Harvey Birdman, Attorney at Law (2000–2007, 2018), Principal Shepherd in Family Guy (2000–present), Dr. James Possible in Kim Possible (2002–2007), Mayor Fred Jones, Sr. in Scooby-Doo! Mystery Incorporated (2010–2013) and Sergeant Bosco in Bob's Burgers (2012–present).

One of his most notable film roles is Bill Lumbergh in Office Space (1999). Other film appearances include In the Line of Fire (1993), A Simple Plan (1998), One Hour Photo (2002), Dodgeball: A True Underdog Story (2004), Talladega Nights: The Ballad of Ricky Bobby (2006) and Pineapple Express (2008).

Early life
Gary Michael Cole was born on September 20, 1956, in Park Ridge, Illinois, and raised in nearby Rolling Meadows. His father, Robert, was a municipal finance director, and his mother, Margaret or "Peggy", was a school administrative assistant. Cole has an older sister, Nancy.

While attending Rolling Meadows High School, Cole made his acting debut as Snoopy in a high school production of Clark Gesner's Peanuts musical You're a Good Man, Charlie Brown. Cole attended Illinois State University, where he studied theater as a classmate with fellow future actors Laurie Metcalf and John Malkovich.

Career

Cole began his professional career in 1983 as a stage actor in Chicago, where he joined the ensemble of the Steppenwolf Theatre Company in 1985. In an early role, Cole played accused Army triple-murderer Capt Jeffrey MacDonald in the mini-series Fatal Vision. Cole has also appeared in several off-Broadway productions in New York City. He has done voice work on several animated series (Family Guy; Kim Possible; Harvey Birdman, Attorney at Law; Archer) and had a recurring role on the drama The West Wing as Vice President Bob Russell.  He also starred as Captain Matthew Gideon on the short-lived Babylon 5 spin-off Crusade, and had notable guest appearances on Law & Order: Special Victims Unit and Arrested Development. He also played Joe Maxwell on DCOM Cadet Kelly and appeared as real-life astronaut Edgar Mitchell in HBO's recreation of Project Apollo, From the Earth to the Moon. One of his most notable roles in 1991 was as General Custer in the much acclaimed television film Son of the Morning Star.

Between 1988 and 1991, Cole became popular on TV for playing the part of Jack "Nighthawk" Killian in the series Midnight Caller. In 1999, Cole starred in the film Office Space, in which he portrayed the micromanaging office supervisor Bill Lumbergh. When asked about the oft-quoted character, Cole said:  He played The Brady Bunch patriarch Mike Brady in the 1995 film The Brady Bunch Movie, the 1996 sequel A Very Brady Sequel, and the 2002 television film The Brady Bunch in the White House.

Cole starred as Lieutenant Conrad Rose on the TNT series Wanted, he is also the voice of the title character on the Adult Swim series Harvey Birdman, Attorney at Law, and starred as Sheriff Lucas Buck on the one season 1995 show, American Gothic. Cole also appeared in the films Talladega Nights, Forever Strong, and American Pastime.

Cole played Katherine Mayfair's ex-husband Wayne on Desperate Housewives and has played the dangerous drug lord Ted Jones in Pineapple Express with Seth Rogen and James Franco. He also appeared in an episode from the third season of the USA Network series Psych as S.W.A.T. commander Cameron Luntz. Cole also played Bill Owens, Sy Parrish's (Robin Williams) boss, in the film One Hour Photo.

In 2008, Cole appeared on Chuck as Sarah's con-artist father (in "Chuck Versus the DeLorean"), a role which he reprised in 2011 (in "Chuck Versus the Wedding Planner"). He also appeared in the fifth season of HBO's Entourage playing Ari Gold's old pal Andrew Klein for a 3-episode story arc prior to joining the regular cast in the sixth season.

He played ballistics expert Kurt McVeigh on The Good Wife and on The Good Fight. In both cases, he played opposite Christine Baranski, who portrayed lawyer Diane Lockhart.

Cole had a guest-appearance on the fourth season of the HBO series True Blood, playing Sookie Stackhouse's grandfather.

In 2011, Cole joined Fox's comedy pilot Tagged, but the series was not picked up.

In 2013, Cole began a recurring role on Suits as Cameron Dennis, the former mentor of Harvey Specter, one of the show's main characters. Also in 2013, Cole began a major recurring role as Kent Davison on the HBO comedy series Veep, joining the main cast at the start of the show's second season. In 2014, he was nominated for the Primetime Emmy Award for Outstanding Guest Actor in a Comedy Series for his work in season three. Additionally, Cole was nominated with his fellow cast members for the Screen Actors Guild Award for Outstanding Performance by an Ensemble in a Comedy Series for seasons 2, 3, 4, and 5 before ultimately winning the award in 2017 for season 6.

Cole currently provides the voice of Sergeant Boscoe on Bob's Burgers and Principal Shepherd on Family Guy. He appears in triplicate as 10 Minutes, 10 Days and 10 Years in the Future Spokesguy in Kabbage's 2019 commercial campaign.

Personal life
Cole married actress Teddi Siddall on March 8, 1992. Their daughter Mary is pursuing an acting career. On June 19, 2017, Siddall filed for divorce. Siddall died in 2018. On July 7, 2021, Cole married interior designer Michelle Knapp.

Filmography

Film

Television

Video games

Notes

References

External links

 
 
 
 The Onion A.V. Club Random Roles article  with Gary Cole

1956 births
Living people
Actors from Park Ridge, Illinois
American male film actors
American male television actors
American male voice actors
Illinois State University alumni
Male actors from Illinois
People from Studio City, Los Angeles
Steppenwolf Theatre Company players
20th-century American male actors
21st-century American male actors